Proceratophrys moratoi is a species of frog in the family Odontophrynidae. It is endemic to the São Paulo state, Brazil. Its local name is botucatu escuerzo.

Its natural habitats are subtropical or tropical moist lowland forest, freshwater marshes, and intermittent freshwater marshes.
It is threatened by habitat loss.

References

Proceratophrys
Endemic fauna of Brazil
Amphibians of Brazil
Taxonomy articles created by Polbot
Amphibians described in 1980
Taxa named by Ulisses Caramaschi